Ballymackey  is a townland and a civil parish in County Tipperary, Ireland. It is located between Toomevara and Cloughjordan It is in the Dáil constituency of Offaly which incorporates 24 electoral divisions that were previously in the constituency of North Tipperary.

Facilities
Ballymackey Football Club plays on an AstroTurf pitch in Ballinree

The recycling centre located at Ballaghveny in Ballymackey was closed in 2011 pending a new arrangement being set up to run the facility.

Notable people
William Chester, the fifth Bishop of Killaloe, Kilfenora, Clonfert and Kilmacduagh and author. Educated at Trinity College, Dublin, held the incumbency at Ballymackey before his appointment to the episcopate in 1884.

The Ó Tighearnaigh of Ormond family held land in Ormond Upper including Ballymackey.

Buildings of interest

The ruined St Michael's church at Cloonmore was commissioned by the Board of First Fruits. The building is listed as being of special Architectural, Archaeological and Social interest.

Castle Willington is an 18th-century Georgian style private residence with a 19th-century towerhouse style extension. Located beside the Ollatrim River in the downland of Killowney Big. The building is listed as being of architectural and archaeological interest.

Townlands in the civil parish
Ballaghveny
Ballinahemery
Ballinree
Ballyknockane
Ballymackey
Bessborough
Clashnevin
Clonalea
Cloonmore
Derrybane
Derrycarney
Donnybrook
Elmhill
Falleen
Garravally
Gortnadrumman
Grenanstown
Kilgorteen
Killeisk
Killowney Big
Killowney Little
Knockahunna
Knockanglass
Lismore
Lisnamoe
Lissanisky
Newtown
Park
Riverlawn
Shanbally
Tooreigh
Wilton
Woodville

See also
List of civil parishes of Tipperary

References

Civil parishes of Ormond Upper
Townlands of County Tipperary